The Pleasantville Music Festival is a single-day music festival which takes place annually at Parkway Field in Pleasantville, New York. Some of the many acts that have performed at the Pleasantville Music Festival are: Everclear, Soul Asylum, Aimee Mann, Matthew Sweet, Blues Traveler Living Colour, Suzanne Vega, Guster, KT Tunstall, The Revivalists, The Smithereens, Gin Blossoms, G Love & Special Sauce, Fastball, Jakob Dylan, Joan Osborne, Marc Cohn, Big Head Todd & the Monsters, the English Beat, and Roger McGuinn. These major acts perform alongside up and coming national acts and small local bands from around the tri-state area.

Musical acts 
2022

The 2022 festival was held July 9, 2022. Headliners were X Ambassadors, Crash Test Dummies, Black Joe Lewis & the Honey Bears, Glenn Tilbrook, Illiterate Light and Paula Cole 

The Main Stage: 
X Ambassadors
Crash Test Dummies +
Black Joe Lewis & the Honey Bears
Glenn Tilbrook 
Clare Maloney & The Great Adventure
Platinum Moon

+ Late replacement for 10,000 Maniacs who were forced to cancel.

The Chill Tent Stage:
Paula Cole
Cole Quest & The City Pickers
Riki Stevens
Greg Jacquin
Chaz Kiss
Carter Quinn Tanis

The Party Stage:
Illiterate Light
The Narrowbacks
Sid Simons
Blankslate
The Breaks Inc
No Shows

2019

The 2019 festival was held July 13, 2019. Headliners were Everclear, Soul Asylum, Aimee Mann, Matthew Sweet and Bailen 

The Main Stage: 
Everclear
Soul Asylum
Aimee Mann
Bailen
Swahoogie
Mosa

The Chill Tent Stage:
Matthew Sweet
Dean Friedman
The Bruce T. Carroll Band
e'lissa jones
Alex Cano
Lillimure

The Party Stage:
The New Respects
Micky James
Tales of Joy
Melt
Color Tongue
Spitphyre

The 2018 festival was held July 14, 2018. Headliners were The Psychedelic Furs, The Lone Bellow, Robert Randolph & the Family Band, and Cracker

The Main Stage:
The Psychedelic Furs
The Lone Bellow
Robert Randolph & the Family Band
Cracker
Lizzie & the Makers
The Bluechips

The Chill Tent Stage:
John Hall w/Fly Amero
Chanelle
Dan Zlotnick
Tim Stout
Emily Angell
David Vogel

The Party Stage:
Harsh Armadillo
Juice
Late Night Episode
Loose Buttons
Friends At The Falls≤
Gilbert

2017
The 2017 festival was headlined by Blues Traveller, Living Color, and Suzanne Vega.

The Main Stage:
Blues Traveller
Living Colour
Suzanne Vega
Hollis Brown
Caleb Flood and The Culture
Riiza

The Chill Tent Stage:
The Pousette-Dart Band
James Maddock
Ghost Millionaires
Khaya
The Shovel Ready String Band
Mary Hood

The Party Stage:
Ripe
Sir Cadian Rhythm
The Alpaca Gnomes
Arc & Stones
Stellar Young
For Lack of a Term

2016 
The 2016 festival was headlined by Guster, KT Tunstall, The Revivalists and The Smithereens.. The festival featured three stages: The Main Stage, The Chill Tent Stage and The Party Stage. The festival attracted thousands of concertgoers and featured a beer and wine garden, kids activities, and vendors.

The Main Stage: 
Guster
KT Tunstall
The Revivalists
The Smithereens
The Annie Minogue Band
Indigo King

The Chill Tent Stage:
Aztec Two Step
Side Saddle
Drew Bordeaux
KT Tunstall (Performing a solo acoustic set)
Don Dilego 
Back 2 Zero

The Party Stage:
Karma Darwin
Wild Adriatic
Rainbow Kitten Surprise
The Amanda Ayala Band

2015 
The 2015 festival was headlined by Gin Blossoms, G Love & Special Sauce, and Fastball.
 
The Main Stage: 
Gin Blossoms
G Love & Special Sauce
Fastball
Lost Leaders
Rebecca Haviland & Whiskey Heart
Wild Planes

The Chill Tent Stage:
Marshall Crenshaw
Andy Suzuki 
East Love
Jeremy James
David Leonard
Megan Talay

The Party Stage:
Beebs & Her Money Makers
Josh Flagg
Lions on the Moon
Regret the Hour

2014  
The 2014 lineup saw headlining sets by Ian Hunter & The Rant Band, and Amy Helm & The Handsome Strangers. The festival featured 2 stages: The Main Stage and The Village Stage.

The Main Stage:
Ian Hunter & The Rant Band
Amy Helm & The Handsome Strangers
Augustana
Jessica Lynn
Scars on 45
Grizfolk
Leroy Justice

The Village Stage:
American Pin-Up
Ben Fuller
Blues Mothers
Spuyten Duyvil
Stone Cold Fox
The Compact

2013 
The 2013 festival was headlined by Brett Dennen and had one stage featuring 10 acts.

The Main Stage:
Brett Dennen
Easy Star All-Stars
Delta Rae
Red Wanting Blue
Bobby Long
Mary C. & The Stellars
Mishti
The Jason Spooner Band
The Kopecky Family Band
The Terrible Friends

2012 

The 2012 festival was headlined by The English Beat, and featured three stages.

The Main Stage:
The English Beat
Delta Spirit
ZZ Ward
Davy Knowles
Good Old War
Susan Said

The Village Stage:
Broverdose
James Adams
Patti Hupp
Red Wanting Blue
Sloan Wainwright
Starnes & Shah
True Apothecary

The Beer & Wine Garden Stage:
The Folkadelics
The Involvement
The ReignJah Band

2011 

The 2011 festival was headlined by Marc Cohn and Augustana. The festival featured three stages.

The Main Stage:
Marc Cohn
Augustana
Sonny Landreth
Nicole Atkins & The Black Sea
Scars on 45
If But When
Tony Bellantoni & The Swag Hooks

The Village Stage:
Chris Fox and Mojo Monde
Johanna
Patti Hupp
Milton
Skyfactor
The Callen Sisters
Nectar
Lisa Brigantino
Remember September
Makeshift Lullaby

The Beer & Wine Garden Stage:
Geoff Hartwell with Andy Aledort
Patti Rothberg
The ReignJah Band

2010 

The 2010 festival was headlined by Jacob Dylan and featured 3 stages.

The Main Stage:
Jakob Dylan
The Bacon Brothers
Carney
Ten Feet Deep
Evan Watson & The Headless Horsemen
Rhett Tyler
The Trapps

The Village Stage:
Beneficial Tomatoes
Sleepy Hollow String Band
The Erin Hobson Compact
Gigi & The Lend Me a Hand Band
Billy Simons
Agent Si
Steven Wright-Mark
Charlotte Kendrick

The Beer & Wine Garden Stage:
Norberto Goldberg
The Melillo Brothers
Frank Enea

2009 
The 2009 festival was headlined by Big Head Todd and The Monsters, and featured three stages.

The Main Stage:
Big Head Todd and The Monsters
Hill Country Revue
Resonant Soul
Davy Knowles & Back Door Slam
Justin Biaggi and The Hopeless Romantics
Kirsten Price
Ever Since

The Village Stage:
Alex Yacovelli
Alison Cipris
Julie Corbalis
Louis G
Nannyhagen Creek
Open Till Midnight
Red Molly
Sabrina Stone
The Ya-Yas

The Beer & Wine Garden Stage:
T Jay
The Bad Habits
The Evan Watson Band
The Mondays

2008 
The 2008 festival was headlined by Joan Osborne and featured three stages.

The Main Stage:
Joan Osborne
Graham Parker
deSol
Back Door Slam
Blindswitch
High Voltage
Nikki Armstrong
The Dig

The Kid's Stage:
Annie and the Natural Wonder Band
David and the Fireflies
Gigi and the Lend Me a Hand Band

The Beer & Wine Garden Stage:
Action Toolbelt
Bad Habits
Halfway Crooks

2007 
The 2007 festival Jonatha Brooke and featured 2 stages.

The Main Stage:
Jonatha Brooke
Shawn Mullins
deSol
Burr Johnson
Coppersonic
Greg Mayo and the Groove
Quintus
The Alternate Routes
The Damnwells
Tribes Hill Ensemble

The Acoustic Stage:
Anthony da Costa
Arlon Bennett
Chuck E. Costa
David Massengill
Gillen and Turk
Hope Machine
Marc Black
McMule
My Dad's Truck
Open Book
Rich Deans

2006 

The Main Stage:
Roger McGuinn
Dar Williams
World Party
Greg Greenway
Jon Cobert
Josh Rutt
Montgomery Delaney
Rhett Tyler
The Same Roberts Band
Vaneese Thomas

The Acoustic Stage:
Anthony da Costa
Dan Pelletier
David Goldman
Hope Machine
Ina May Wool w/Dan Weiss
Iris Cohen
James Durst
Jeffry Braun
Kathleen Pemble w/Ali Chambliss
Lara Herscovitch
Marianne Osiel
Matt Turk
Nannyhagen Creek
Nick Olva w/Dennis Rivellino
Open Book
Pat Wictor
Rhonda Schuster
Susan Kane
Todd Giudice

 2005 The Main Stage:American Flyer
David Goldman
Dough
Gandalf Murphy and the Slambovian Circus of Dreams
Geoff Hartwell
Jake Holmes
Jim Zimmerman and Full Circle
Jonathan Edwards
MotherLode Trio
Patricia Shih
Sweet Nothing Music CollectiveThe Acoustic Stage:
Alastair Moock
Anthony da Costa
Chris Brown
Foggy Dew
Hope Machine
Jeffry Braun
Kathleen Pemble
KJ Denhert
Little Village Playhouse
Montgomery Delaney
Nannyhagen Creek
Open Book
Pat Wictor
Patrick Matteson
Rubber Sould (Steve Worthy & Eddie Denise)
Steve Blake and the Swing Commandos
Susan Kane
Terence Martin

References

External links
Pleasantville Music Festival Official Website
PMF Official Photo Gallery
107.1 The Peak Official Website

Music festivals in New York (state)
Rock festivals in the United States
Music festivals established in 2005
Mount Pleasant, New York
Tourist attractions in Westchester County, New York